Edward Hagarty Parry (24 April 1855 – 19 July 1931) was a footballer. Born in Canada, he played for the England national team.

Early life
Born in Toronto, Ontario, where his father served as a clergyman, Parry attended Charterhouse School from 1868 to 1874, and Exeter College, Oxford, where he graduated as B.A. in 1878 and M.A. in 1885.

Football career

Parry played three times for England, against Wales in 1879 and 1882 and Scotland in 1882. He scored once.

He was captain (and goal-scorer) of the Old Carthusians team which won the 1881 FA Cup Final defeating Old Etonians 3–0. He was the first overseas-born captain of an FA Cup winning team, and the last until Irishman Johnny Carey with Manchester United in 1948 (and not Eric Cantona 48 years later).

He was also a member of the Wanderers club  as well as for Swifts of Slough, Remnants, Windsor, and Stoke Poges FC clubs.

Later life
Parry became a schoolmaster at Felsted School in 1879 before settling at Stoke House private school, Stoke Poges, Buckinghamshire in 1881, becoming its head master in 1892 and retiring in 1918. He was national chairman of the Private Schools Association in 1907 and sat on its council for many years. After his retirement, he helped to run the Officers' Family Fund for sons of officers who died in the recent First World War.

Parry became blind in his later years and died at his last home in West Bridgford, Nottingham on 19 July 1931, aged seventy-six. He was buried at the parish church at Plumtree, Nottinghamshire.

Honours
Oxford University
FA Cup runner-up: 1877

Old Carthusians
FA Cup winner: 1881

International goals

Scores and results list England's goal tally first.

See also
 List of England international footballers born outside England

References

External links
Article on Canadian-born footballers
Medal referring to Parry
England profile

1855 births
1931 deaths
People from Old Toronto
People educated at Charterhouse School
English people of Canadian descent
English footballers
England international footballers
Canadian soccer players
Pre-Confederation Canadian emigrants to the United Kingdom
Oxford University A.F.C. players
Wanderers F.C. players
Old Carthusians F.C. players
Swifts F.C. players
Association football forwards
People from West Bridgford
Footballers from Nottinghamshire
Canadian expatriate soccer players
Remnants F.C. players
FA Cup Final players